French Lake Reservoir (National ID # CA00247) is a reservoir in Nevada County, California.

The earthen, rock-fill French Lake Dam was first constructed in 1859, and is a candidate for the first use of rock-fill in an engineered dam. Reconstructed in 1948, it impounds Canyon Creek for flood control, irrigation water storage, municipal drinking water, and hydropower. It is one of ten facilities operated by Nevada Irrigation District.

Overview
The site is surrounded by Tahoe National Forest. The adjacent namesake townsite of French Lake, California is a ghost town of the California Gold Rush era.

See also 
List of dams and reservoirs in California
List of lakes in California

References 

Dams in California
Reservoirs in Nevada County, California
United States local public utility dams
Reservoirs in California
Reservoirs in Northern California